The Virgo interferometer is a large interferometer designed to detect gravitational waves predicted by the general theory of relativity. Virgo is a Michelson interferometer that is isolated from external disturbances: its mirrors and instrumentation are suspended and its laser beam operates in a vacuum. The instrument's two arms are three kilometres long and located in Santo Stefano a Macerata, near the city of Pisa, Italy.

Virgo is hosted by the European Gravitational Observatory (EGO), a consortium founded by the French CNRS and Italian INFN. The Virgo Collaboration operates the detector and is composed of more than 650 members, representing 119 institutions in 14 different countries. Other interferometers similar to Virgo have the same goal of detecting gravitational waves, including the two LIGO interferometers in the United States (at the Hanford Site and in Livingston, Louisiana). Since 2007, Virgo and LIGO have agreed to share and jointly analyze the data recorded by their detectors and to jointly publish their results. Because the interferometric detectors are not directional (they survey the whole sky) and they are looking for signals which are weak, infrequent, one-time events, simultaneous detection of a gravitational wave in multiple instruments is necessary to confirm the signal validity and to deduce the angular direction of its source.

The interferometer is named for the Virgo Cluster of about 1,500 galaxies in the Virgo constellation, about 50 million light-years from Earth. As no terrestrial source of gravitational wave is powerful enough to produce a detectable signal, Virgo must observe the Universe. The more sensitive the detector, the further it can see gravitational waves, which then increases the number of potential sources. This is relevant as the violent phenomena Virgo is potentially sensitive to (coalescence of a compact binary system, neutron stars or black holes; supernova explosion; etc.) are rare: the more galaxies Virgo is surveying, the larger the probability of a detection.

History 
The Virgo project was approved in 1992 by the French CNRS and in 1993 by the Italian INFN, the two institutes at the origin of the experiment. The construction of the detector started in 1996 in the Cascina site near Pisa, Italy. In December 2000, CNRS and INFN created the European Gravitational Observatory (EGO consortium). The Dutch Institute for Nuclear and High-Energy Physics Nikhef later joined as an observer and eventually a full member. EGO is responsible for the Virgo site, in charge of the construction, the maintenance and the operation of the detector, as well as of its upgrades. The goal of EGO is also to promote research and studies about gravitation in Europe.

The Virgo Collaboration works on the realization and operation of the Virgo interferometer. As of February 2021, more than 650 members, representing 119 institutions in 14 different countries are part of the collaboration. This includes institutions from: France, Italy, the Netherlands, Poland, Spain, Belgium, Germany, Hungary, Portugal, Greece, Czechia, Denmark, Ireland, Monaco, China, and Japan.

Conception 
Although the concept of gravitational waves is more than a 100 years old, having been predicted by Einstein in 1916, it was not before the 1970s that serious projects for detecting them started to appear. The first were the so-called Weber bars, invented by Joseph Weber, which could in principle detect gravitational waves, and triggered a number of projects such as AURIGA. While none of these projects succeeded, they did trigger the creation of many research groups dedicated to gravitational wave search. The idea of a large interferometric detector began to gain credibility, and in 1987, the Virgo project was born under the impulsion of the Italian researcher Adalberto Giazotto and the French researcher Alain Brillet. After being approved by the CNRS in 1992 and in the INFN in 1993, the construction of the interferometer began in 1996, with the aim of beginning observations by the year 2000.

The first goal of Virgo was to directly observe gravitational waves. The study over three decades of the binary pulsar 1913+16, whose discovery was awarded the 1993 Nobel Prize in Physics, had already led to indirect evidence of the existence of gravitational waves. The observed decrease over time of this binary pulsar's orbital period was in excellent agreement with the hypothesis that the system is losing energy by emitting gravitational waves.

The initial Virgo detector 

In the 2000s, the Virgo detector was built, commissioned and operated. The instrument reached its design sensitivity to gravitational wave signals. This initial endeavour was used to validate the Virgo technical design choices; and it also demonstrated that giant interferometers are promising devices to detect gravitational waves in a wide frequency band. The construction of the Initial Virgo detector was completed in June 2003 and several data taking periods followed between 2007 and 2011. Some of these runs were done in coincidence with the two LIGO detectors. The initial Virgo detector recorded scientific data from 2007 to 2011 during four science runs. There was a shut-down of a few months in 2010 to allow for a major upgrade of the Virgo suspension system: the original suspension steel wires were replaced by glass fibers in order to reduce the thermal noise. After several months of data taking with this final configuration, the initial Virgo detector was shut down in September 2011 to begin the installation of Advanced Virgo.

The Advanced Virgo detector 

However, the initial Virgo detector was not sensitive enough to detect such gravitational waves. Therefore, it was decommissioned in 2011 and replaced by the Advanced Virgo detector which aims at increasing its sensitivity by a factor of 10, allowing it to probe a volume of the Universe 1,000 times larger, making detections of gravitational waves more likely. The original detector is generally referred to as the "initial Virgo" or "original Virgo". The Advanced Virgo detector benefits from the experience gained on the initial detector and from technological advances since it was made.

The Advanced Virgo is 10 times more sensitive than the initial Virgo. According to the Advanced Virgo Technical Design Report VIR–0128A–12 of 2012, advanced Virgo keeps the same vacuum infrastructure as Virgo, with four additional cryotraps located at both ends of both three-kilometre-long arms to trap residual particles coming from the mirror towers, but the remainder of the interferometer has been significantly upgraded. The new mirrors are larger (350 mm in diameter, with a weight of 40 kg), and their optical performances have been improved. The critical optical elements used to control the interferometer are under vacuum on suspended benches. A system of adaptive optics was to be installed to correct the mirror aberrations in-situ. In the final Advanced Virgo configuration, the laser power will be 200 W.

Advanced Virgo started the commissioning process in 2016, joining the two advanced LIGO detectors ("aLIGO") for a first "engineering" observing period in May and June 2017. On 14 August 2017, LIGO and Virgo detected a signal, GW170814, which was reported on 27 September 2017. It was the first binary black hole merger detected by both LIGO and Virgo (and the first one for Virgo).

Just few days later, GW170817 was detected by the LIGO and Virgo on 17 August 2017. The GW was produced by the last minutes of two neutron stars spiralling closer to each other and finally merging, and is the first GW observation which has been confirmed by non-gravitational means.

After further upgrades Virgo started the "O3" observation run in April 2019, it was planned to last one year, followed by further upgrades. At 17:00 UTC, 27th of March, 2020, the third observation period (O3) of the Virgo Collaboration and the LIGO Scientific Collaboration was suspended because of the COVID-19 pandemic.

The upgrades currently underway are part of the "Advanced Virgo +" upgrade, divided in two phases, the first one preceeding the O4 run and the second one preceeding the O5 run. The first phase focuses on the reduction of the quantum noise, by introducing a more powerful laser, improving the squeezing introduced in O3 and implementing a new technique called signal recycling ; seismic sensors will also be installed around the mirrors. The second phase will then try to reduce the mirror thermal noise, by changing the geometry of the laser beam to increase its size on the mirrors (spreading the energy on a larger area and thus reducing the temperature), and by improving the coating of the mirrors ; the end mirrors will also be significantly larger, requiring improvements to the suspension. Further improvements to the quantum noise are also expected in the second phase, building upon the changes from the first phase.

Future 
The gravitational wave observatories LIGO, Virgo, and KAGRA are coordinating to continue observations after the COVID-caused stop and as of February 2023, plan to start the O4 observing run together in May 2023. Virgo projects a sensitivity goal of 80–115 Mpc for binary neutron star mergers (sensitivities: LIGO 160–190 Mpc, KAGRA greater than 1 Mpc). This run is expected to last for 18 months instead of the 12 months initially envisioned, in order to accommodate upgrades planned for the following run.

Following this run, the detector will once again be shut down to undergo upgrades, including an improvement in the coating of the mirrors. A fifth observing run (O5) is currently planned for the beginning of 2027, with a projected sensitivity of 150-260 Mpc for Virgo (although these plans are only previsional).

No official plans have been announced for the future of the Virgo installations following the O5 period, although projects for further improving the detectors have been suggested.

Science case 

The Advanced Virgo interferometer aims to detect and study gravitational waves from astrophysical sources in the Universe. The main known gravitational-wave emitting systems within the sensibility of ground-base interferometers are: black hole and/or neutron star binary mergers, rotating neutron stars, bursts and supernovae explosions, and even the gravitational-wave background due to the Big Bang. Moreover, gravitational radiation may also lead to the discovery of unexpected and theoretically predicted exotic objects.

Coalescences of black holes and neutron stars 

When two massive and compact objects such as black holes and neutron stars start spinning one around the other during the inspiral phase, they emit gravitational radiation and, therefore, lose energy. Hence, they begin to get closer to each other, increasing the frequency and the amplitude of the gravitational waves: it is the coalescence phenomenon and can last for millions of years. The final stage is the merger of the two objects, eventually forming a black hole. The part of the waveform corresponding to the merger has the largest amplitude and highest frequency. It can only be modeled by performing numerical relativity simulations of these systems. The interferometer is designed to be sensitive to the late phase of the coalescence of black hole and neutron star binaries: only between several milliseconds and a seconds of the whole process can be observed. All detections so far have been of black hole or neutron star mergers.

Bursts and supernovae 
Any signal lasting from a few milliseconds to a few seconds is considered a gravitational wave burst. Supernovae explosions, the gravitational collapse of massive stars at the end of their lives, emit gravitational radiation that can be seen by the Advanced Virgo interferometer. A multi-messenger detection (electromagnetic and gravitational radiation, and neutrinos) would help to better understand the supernovae process and the formation of black holes.

Rotating neutron stars 
Neutron stars are the second most compact known object in the Universe, right after black holes. They have approximately one and a half masses as the Sun, but contained within a sphere of approximately 10-km of radius. Pulsars are special cases of neutron stars that emit light pulses periodically: they can spin up to 1000 times per second. Any small deviation from axial symmetry (a tiny "mountain" on the surface) will generate continuous gravitational waves.

Gravitational-wave stochastic background 
Several physical sources may be the source of a gravitational wave stochastic background, that is an additional source of noise of astrophysical origin. It represents a continuous source of gravitational waves, but unlike continuous wave sources like rotating neutron stars, it comes from large regions of the sky instead of a single location.

The Cosmic Microwave Background (CMB) is the earliest time of the Universe that can be observed in the electromagnetic spectrum. However, cosmological models predict the emission of gravitational waves generated instants after the Big Bang. Because gravitational waves interact very weakly with matter, detecting such background would give more insight in the cosmological evolution of our Universe. In particular, it could provide evidence of the inflation phenomenon, either from gravitational waves emitted by the process of inflation itself according to some theories, or at the end of inflation.

Moreover, Advanced Virgo may be able to detect an astrophysical background resulting from the superposition of all faint and distant sources emitting gravitational waves at all times, which would help to study the evolution of astrophysical sources and star formation. The most likely sources to contribute to the astrophysical background are binary neutron stars, binary black holes or neutron star-black hole binaries. Other possible sources include supernovae and pulsars.

FInally, cosmic strings may represent a source of gravitational wave background, whose detection could provide proof that cosmic strings actually exist.

Exotic sources 
Non conventional, alternative models of compact objects have been proposed by physicists. Some examples of these models can be described within General Relativity (quark and strange stars, boson and Proca stars, Kerr black holes with scalar and Proca hair), arise from some approaches to quantum gravity (cosmic strings, fuzzballs, gravastars), and also come from alternative theories of gravity (scalarised neutron stars or black holes, wormholes). Theoretically predicted exotic compact objects could now be detected and would help to elucidate the true nature of gravity or discover new forms of matter. Besides, completely unexpected phenomena may be observed, unveiling new physics.

Gravitational wave polarization 
Gravitational waves have two polarization: "plus" and "cross" polarization. The polarization depends on the nature of the source (for instance, precessing spins in a black hole binary merger generate gravitational waves with "cross" polarization). Therefore, detecting the polarization of the gravitational radiation would give more insight in the physical properties of the system.

Lensed gravitational wave 
This can result in an increase in the amplitude of the wave, or even multiple observation of the event at separate time, as we currently observe with the light of supernovae. Such events are predicted to be common enough to be detected by the current detectors in the near future. Microlensing effects are also predicted. Detecting a lensed event would allow for a very precise localization, further tests of the speed of gravity and of the polarization.

Instrument

General design

Detection principle 
In general relativity, a gravitational wave is a space-time perturbation which propagates at the speed of light. It then curves slightly the space-time, which changes locally the light path. Mathematically speaking, if  is the amplitude (assumed to be small) of the incoming gravitational wave and  the length of the optical cavity in which the light is in circulation, the change  of the optical path due to the gravitational wave is given by the formula:

with  being a geometrical factor which depends on the relative orientation between the cavity and the direction of propagation of the incoming gravitational wave. In other terms, the change in length is proportional to both to the length of the cavity and the amplitude of the gravitational wave.

Interferometer 

Virgo is a Michelson interferometer whose mirrors are suspended. A laser is divided into two beams by a beam splitter tilted by 45 degrees. The two beams propagate in the two perpendicular arms of the interferometer, are reflected by mirrors located at the end of the arms and recombine on the beam splitter, generating interferences which are detected by a photodiode. An incoming gravitational wave changes the optical path of the laser beams in the arms, which then changes the interference pattern recorded by the photodiode.

The signal induced by a potential gravitational wave is thus "embedded" in the light intensity variations detected at the interferometer output. Yet, several external causes—globally denoted as noise—change the interference pattern perpetually and significantly. Should nothing be done to remove or mitigate them, the expected physical signals would be buried in noise and would then remain undetectable. The design of detectors like Virgo and LIGO thus requires a detailed inventory of all noise sources which could impact the measurement, allowing a strong and continuing effort to reduce them as much as possible.

Laser and injection system 
The laser is the light source of the experiment. It must be powerful, while extremely stable in frequency as well as in amplitude. To meet all these specifications which are somewhat opposing, the beam starts from a very low power, yet very stable, laser. The light from this laser passes through several amplifiers which enhance its power by a factor 100. A 50 W output power was achieved for the last configuration of the initial Virgo detector—called "Virgo+"— and later reached 100 W during the O3 run ; it is expected to be upgraded to 130 W at the beginning of the O4 run. The retained solution is to have a fully fibered laser with an amplification stage made of fibers as well, to improve the robustness of the system.

This laser is then sent into the interferometer after passing through the injection system, which further ensures the stability of the beam, adjusts its shape and power and positions it correctly for entering the interferometer. Key components of the injection system include the input mode cleaner (a 140 m long cavity allowing to clean the beam), a Faraday isolator preventing any light from returning to the laser, and a mode matching telescope, which adapts the size and position of the beam right before it enters the interferometer.

Mirrors 

The large mirrors of the arm cavities are the most critical optics of the interferometer. They include the two end mirrors, located at the end of the 3-km interferometer arms, and the two input mirrors, located near the beginning of the arms. Together, those mirrors make a resonant optical cavity in each arm, where the light bounces thousands of times before returning to the beam splitter, maximizing the effect of the signal on the laser path. It also allows to increase the power of the light stored in the arms. These mirrors are non-standard pieces, made from state-of-the-art technologies. They are cylinders 35 cm in diameter and 20 cm thick, made from the purest glass in the world. The mirrors are polished to the atomic level in order to not diffuse (and hence lose) any light. Finally, a reflective coating (a Bragg reflector made with ion beam sputtering, or IBS) is added. The mirrors located at the end of the arms reflect all incoming light; less than 0.002% of the light is lost at each reflection.

In addition, two other mirrors are present in the design. The first one is the power recycling mirror, placed between the laser and the beam splitter. As most of the light is reflected toward the laser after coming back to the beam splitter, this mirror allows to reinject this light into the main interferometer, increasing the power in the arms. The second one, called signal recycling mirror, is currently planned to be installed for the next run, as part of the Advanced Virgo+ upgrades ; it allows to reinject part of the signal within the interferometer (currently, the transmission of the mirror is planned to be 40%), effectively forming another cavity. The point of this is that by making small adjustments to the signal recycling mirror, one can tune the interferometer by reducing the quantum noise in part of the frequency band, while increasing it in others. It is currently planned to use the "wideband" configuration, decreasing the noise at high and low frequencies but increasing it at intermediate frequencies. The decreased noise at high frequencies is of particular interest to study the signal from moments right before and after the merger.In order to mitigate the seismic noise which could propagate up to the mirrors, shaking them and hence obscuring potential gravitational wave signals, the large mirrors are suspended by a complex system. All of the main mirrors are suspended by four thin fibers made of silica (hence in glass) which are attached to a series of attenuators. This chain of suspension, called the 'superattenuator', is close to 10 meters high and is also under vacuum. The superattenuators do not only limit the disturbances on the mirrors, they also allow the mirror position and orientation to be precisely steered. The optical table where the injection optics used to shape the laser beam are located, such as the benches used for the light detection, are also suspended and under vacuum, in order to limit the seismic and acoustic noises. For advanced Virgo, the whole instrumentation used to detect gravitational waves signals and to steer the interferometer (photodiodes, cameras and the associated electronics) are also installed on several suspended benches, and under vacuum. This choice and the use of light traps (called baffles) inside the vacuum pipes, prevent the residual seismic noise from being reintroduced into the dark port signals because of spurious reflections from diffused light.

Infrastructure 
Seen from the air, the Virgo detector has a characteristic "L" shape with its two 3-km long perpendicular arms. The arm "tunnels" house vacuum pipes with a 120 cm diameter in which the laser beams are travelling under ultra-high vacuum. 

Virgo is the largest ultra-high vacuum installation in Europe, with a total volume of 6,800 cubic meters. The two 3-km arms are made of a long pipe 1.2m in diameter in which the residual pressure is about 1 thousandth of a billionth of an atmosphere. Thus, the residual air molecules are not disturbing the path of the laser beams. Large gate valves are located at both ends of the arms so that work can be done in the mirror vacuum towers without breaking the arm ultra-high vacuum. Indeed, both Virgo arms have been kept under vacuum since 2008.

Due to the high power in the interferometer, the mirrors are susceptible to thermal effects due to the heating induced by the laser (despite having an extremely low absorption) ; these can take the shape of a deformation of the surface due to dilation, or a change in the refractive index of the substrate ; this results in power escaping from the interferometer and in perturbations of the signal. These two effects are accounted for by the thermal compensation system (TCS), which includes sensors called Hartmann wavefront sensors (HWS) used to measure the optical aberration through an auxiliary light source, and two actuators : CO2 lasers, allowing to selectively heat parts of the mirror to correct the defects, and ring heaters, which precisely adjust the radius of curvature of the mirror. The system also corrects the "cold defects", which are permanent defects introduced during the mirror manufacturing. During the O3 run, the TCS was able to increase the power circulating inside the interferometer by 15%, and decrease the power leaving the interferometer by a factor 2.

Noise and sensitivity

Noise sources 
Due to the precision required in the measurement, the Virgo detector is sensitive to a number of sources of noise which limit the precision of the measure. Some of these sources correspond to large frequency ranges and limit the overall sensitivity of the detector:

seismic noise (any ground motion whose sources are numerous: waves in the Mediterranean sea, wind, human activity for instance the traffic during daytime, etc.), generally in the low frequencies up to about 10 Hertz (Hz);
 the thermal noise of the mirrors and their suspension wires, corresponding to the agitation of the mirror/suspension from its own temperature, from a few tens of Hz up to a few hundreds;
 quantum noise, which includes the laser shot noise, corresponding to the fluctuation of the power received by the detectors and relevant above a few hundreds of Hz, and the radiation pressure noise, corresponding to the pressure applied by the laser on the mirror, which is relevant at low frequency.
 Newtonian noise, caused by the variation of the gravity field which affects the position of the mirror, relevant below 20 Hz

Additional noise sources may also have a short-term impact : bad weather or earthquakes may temporarily increase the noise level.

Finally, a number of short-lived artifacts may appear in the data due to many possible instrumental issues ; these are usually referred to as 'glitches'. It is estimated that about 20% of the detected events are impacted by glitches, requiring specific data processing methods to mitigate their impact.

Detector sensitivity 

A detector like Virgo is characterized by its sensitivity, a figure of merit providing information about the tiniest signal the instrument could detect—the smaller the value of the sensitivity, the better the detector. The sensitivity varies with frequency as each noise has its own frequency range.

The most common measure for the sensitivity of a gravitational wave detector is the "horizon distance", defined as the distance at which a binary neutron star with masses 1.4 -1.4  (where  is the solar mass) produces a signal-to-noise ratio of 8 in the detector. It is generally expressed in megaparsecs. For instance, the range for Virgo during the O3 run was between 40 and 50 Mpc. This range is only an indicator and does not represent a maximal range for the detector ; signals from more massive sources will have a larger amplitude, and can thus be detected from further away.

Virgo is a wide band detector whose sensitivity ranges from a few Hz up to 10 kHz. Mathematically speaking, its sensitivity is characterized by its power spectrum which is computed in real time using the data recorded by the detector. The curve opposite shows an example of a Virgo amplitude spectrum density (the square root of the power spectrum) from 2011, plotted using log-log scale.

Improving the sensitivity 
Using an interferometer rather than a single optical cavity allows one to enhance significantly the sensitivity of the detector to gravitational waves. Indeed, in this configuration based on an interference measurement, the contributions from some experimental noises are strongly reduced: instead of being proportional to the length of the single cavity, they depend in that case on the length difference between the arms (so equal arm length cancels the noise). And the interference at the output port of a Michelson interferometer depends on the difference of length between the two arms: the measured effect is hence amplified by a factor 2 with respect to a simple cavity.

Then, one has to "freeze" the various mirrors of the interferometer: when they move, the optical cavity length changes and so does the interference signal read at the instrument output port. The mirror positions relative to a reference and their alignment are monitored accurately in real time with a precision better than the tenth of a nanometre for the lengths; at the level of a few nanoradians for the angles. The more sensitive the detector, the narrower its optimal working point.

Reaching that working point from an initial configuration in which the various mirrors are moving freely is a control system challenge. In a first step, each mirror is controlled locally to damp its residual motion; then, an automated sequence of steps, usually long and complex, allows one to make the transition between a series of independent local controls to a unique global control steering the interferometer as a whole. Once this working point is reached, it is simpler to keep it as error signals read in real time provide a measurement of the deviation between the actual state of the interferometer and its optimal condition. From the measured differences, mechanical corrections are applied on the various mirrors to bring the system closer to its best working point.

The optimal working point of an interferometric detector of gravitational waves is slightly detuned from the "dark fringe", a configuration in which the two laser beams recombined on the beam splitter interfere in a destructive way: almost no light is detected at the output port. To improve it, these two quantities must be increased.
 The arms of the Virgo detector are thus 3-km long.
 To increase even more (by a factor 50) the length of the laser optical paths, highly reflecting mirrors are installed at the entry of the kilometric arms to create Fabry-Perot cavities.
 Finally, as the interferometer is tuned on the dark fringe and that the mirrors located at the end of the arms are highly reflecting as well, almost all the laser power is sent back to the laser source from the beam splitter. Therefore, an additional highly reflecting mirror is located in this area to recycle the light and store it inside the instrument.

Data analysis 
An important part of the Virgo collaboration resources are dedicated to the development and deployment of data analysis software designed to process the output of the detector. Apart from the data acquisition software and the tools for distributing the data, this effort is mostly shared with members of the LIGO and KAGRA collaborations, as part of the LIGO-Virgo-KAGRA (LVK) collaboration.

The data from the detector is initally only available to LVK members ; segments of data around detected events are released at the time of publication of the related paper, and the full data is released after a proprietary period, currently lasting 18 months. During the third observing run (O3), this resulted in two separated data releases (O3a and O3b), corresponding to the first six months and last six months of the run respectively. The data is then available for anyone on the gravitational wave open science center (GWOSC) platform.

Transient searches

Event detection pipelines 
During the O3 run, five different pipelines have been used to identify event candidates within the data. Four of them (GstLAL, PyCBC, MBTA and SPIIR) were dedicated to the detection of compact binary coalescences (the only type of event detected so far), while the fifth one (cWB) was designed to detect any signal.

All five pipelines have been used during the run ("online") as part of the low-latency alert system, and after the run ("offline") to spot events which may have been missed (except for SPIIR, which was only run online).

The four CBC pipelines all rely on the concept of matched filtering, a technique which can be used to look for a known signal within noisy data in an optimal way. The major issue with using this technique to search for gravitational wave is that it requires some knowledge of what the signal looks like. Although reasonable models exist, the complexity of the equations governing the dynamics of a compact merger makes the generation of accurate waveforms difficult ; the development of new waveforms is still an active field of research. In addition, the sources cover a wide range of possible parameters (masses and spins of the two objects, sky location) which will yield different waveforms, instead of having one specific signal. This prompts the researchers to generate "template banks" containing a large amount of different waveforms corresponding to different parameters ; a compromise has to be done between how tight the bank is (maximizing the number of detections) and the limited computational resources available to carry out the search with all the templates. How to generate such template banks efficiently is also an active field of research.

Although the four searches use the same base technique, they all have different optimizations and specificities on how they handle the data ; in particular they use different techniques for estimating the significance of an event, for discriminating between real events and glitches or for combining the data from the different detectors ; they also use different template banks.

The cWB (coherent wave burst) pipeline uses a completely separate approach : it works by grouping the streams of the different detectors and carrying a joint analysis of the data to look for coherent signals among the different detectors. Although its sensitivity for binary mergers is less than the dedicated CBC pipelines, its strength lies in being able to detect signals from any kind of sources, as it does not require any assumption on the shape of the signal (which is why it often referred to as an "unmodelled" search).

Low-latency 
The low-latency system designed to produce alerts for astronomers when gravitational events are detected, with the hope that an electromagnetic counterpart can be observed. This is achieved by centralizing the event candidates from the different analysis pipelines in the gravitational-wave candidate event database (GraceDB), from which the data is processed. If an event is deemed significant enough, a rapid sky localization is produced preliminary alerts are sent autonomously within the span of a few minutes ; after a more precise evaluation of the source parameters, as well as human vetting from the rapid response team, a new alert or a retraction notice is sent within a day. The alerts are sent through the GCN, which also centralizes alerts from gamma-ray and neutrino telescopes, as well as SciMMA. A total of 78 alerts have been sent during the O3 run, of which 23 were later retracted.

Parameter estimation 
After an event has been detected by one of the event detection pipelines, a deeper analysis is performed in order to get a more precise estimation of the parameters of the source and the measurement uncertainty. During the O3 run, this was carried out using several different pipelines, including Bilby and RIFT.

Search for counterparts 
While many astronomers try to follow-up the low-latency alerts from gravitational wave detectors, the reverse also exists : electromagnetic events expected to have an associated gravitational wave emission are subjected to a deeper search. One of the prime targets for these are gamma-ray bursts ; these are thought to be associated with supernovae ("long" bursts, lasting more than 2 seconds) and with compact binary coalescenses involving neutron stars ("short" bursts). The merger of two neutron stars in particular has been confirmed to be associated with both a gamma-ray burst and gravitational waves with the GW170817 event.

Searches targeted toward gamma-ray bursts have been performed on the past runs using the pyGRB pipeline for CBC, using methods similar to the regular searches, but centered around the time of the bursts and targeting only the sky area found by gamma-ray observatories. An unmodelled search was also carried out using the X-pipeline package, in a similar fashion as regular unmodelled searches.

Continuous wave searches 
Searches dedicated to the search for periodic gravitational waves, such as the ones generated by rapidly rotating neutron stars, are generally referred to as continuous wave searches. These can be divided in three categories : "all-sky" searches, which look for unknown signals from any direction, directed searches, aiming for stars with known positions but unknown frequency, and targeted searches, looking for signals from sources where both the position and the frequency are known. The directed and targeted searches are motivated by the fact that all-sky searches are extremely computationally expensive, and thus require trade-offs that limit their sensitivity.

The principal challenge in continuous wave search is that the signal is much weaker than current detected transients, meaning that one must observe a long time period to accumulate enough data to detect it. The issue is that over such long periods of time, the frequency from the source will evolve, and the motion of the Earth around the Sun will affect the frequency via the Doppler effect. This greatly increases the computational cost of the search, even more so when the frequency is unknown. Although there are mitigation strategies, such as "semi-coherent" searches, where the analysis is performed on segments from the data rather than the full data, these result in a loss of sensistivity. Other approaches include "cross-correlation", inspired by stochastic wave searches, which takes advantage of having multiple detectors to look for a correlated signal in a pair of detectors.

Stochastic wave searches 
The stochastic gravitational wave background is another target for data analysis teams. By definition, it can be seen as a source of noise in the detectors ; the main challenge is to separate it from the other sources of noise, and measure its power spectral density. The easiest method for solving this issue is to look for correlations between two detectors ; the idea being that the noise related to the GW background will be identical in both detectors, while the instrumental noise will not be correlated acrosse the detectors. Another possible approach requiring would be to look for excess power not accounted by other noise sources ; however, this proves impractical for current interferometers (including Virgo) as the noise is not know well enough compared to the expected power of the background. Only searches based on cross-correlation between detectors are currently in use.

This kind of search must also account for the detectors antenna pattern, the motion of the Earth, the distance between the detectors, etc. Assumptions also have to be made on some properties of the background ; it is common to assume that it is Gaussian and isotropic, but searches for anisotropic, non-Gaussian and more exotic backgrounds also exist.

Scientific results 

The first detection of a gravitational signal by Virgo took place at the beginning of the second observing run (O2), as Virgo was absent from the first observing run. The event, named GW170814, was a coalescence between two black holes, and also the first event to be detected by three different detectors, allowing for its localization to be greatly improved compared to the events from the first observing run.

It was soon followed by the more famous GW170817, first merger of two neutron stars detected by the gravitational wave network, and as of January 2023 the only event with a confirmed detection of an electromagnetic counterpart, both in gamma rays and in optical telescopes, and later in the radio and x-ray domains. While no signal was observed in Virgo, this absence was crucial to put tighter constraints on the localization of the event. This event had tremendous repercussions in the astronomical community, involving more than 4000 astronomers, improving the understanding of neutron star mergers and putting very tight constraints on the speed of gravity.

Several searches for continuous gravitational waves have been performed on data from the past runs. On the O3 run, these include an all-sky search, targeted searches toward Scorpius X-1 and a number of known pulsars (including the Crab and Vela pulsars), and directed search towards the supernova remnants Cassiopeia A and Vela Jr. and the galactic center. While none of the sources managed to identify a signal, this allowed to set upper limits on some parameters ; in particular, it was found that the deviation from perfect spinning balls for close known pulsars is at most of the order of 1 mm.

Virgo was included in the latest search for a gravitational wave background along with LIGO, combining the results with the ones from the O1 and O2 runs (which only used LIGO data). No stochastic background was observed, improving previous constraints on the energy of the background by an order of magnitude.

Outreach 
One of the goals of the EGO consortium is to "promote communication, outreach, education and engagement of citizens at large on the theme of gravitational waves and Multi-messenger Astronomy". In order to achieve this goal, Virgo scientists have been involved in a number of outreach activities, including :

 participation in art exhibitions, such as "The Rhythm of Space" at the Museo della Grafica in Pisa, or "On Air" at the Palais de Tokyo
 organize guided tours of the Virgo facilities for schools, universities and the general public
 involvement in activities promoting gender equality in science

Gallery

See also 
BlackGEM

References

External links 
 Description on EGO's website 
 Virgo's homepage
 Advanced Virgo Technical Design Report

Interferometric gravitational-wave instruments
Astronomical observatories in Italy